Dr. Nathan M. Blalock House is a historic home located near Raleigh, Wake County, North Carolina.  It was built about 1910, and is a two-story, double-pile, Classical Revival-style frame dwelling with a hipped roof.  The front facade features a full height, projecting pedimented portico supported by two pairs of fluted wood Ionic order columns and one-story wraparound porch.  Also on the property are the contributing well house (c. 1910) and wall (c. 1910).

It was listed on the National Register of Historic Places in 2005.

References

Houses on the National Register of Historic Places in North Carolina
Neoclassical architecture in North Carolina
Houses completed in 1910
Houses in Wake County, North Carolina
National Register of Historic Places in Wake County, North Carolina